This is a list of currently existing qin societies, of which some are learned societies.

There is a difference between qin schools and qin societies. The former concerns itself with transmission of a style, the latter concerns itself with performance. The qin society will encourage meetings with fellow qin players in order to play music and maybe discuss the nature of the qin. Gatherings such as this are called yaji (雅集, literally "elegant gatherings"), and take place once every month or two. Sometimes, societies may go on excursions to places of natural beauty to play qin, or attend conferences. They may also participate in competitions or research. Of course, societies do not have to have a strict structure to adhere to; it could mostly be on a leisurely basis. The main purpose of qin societies is to promote and play qin music. It is often a good opportunity to network and learn to play the instrument, to ask questions and to receive answers.

Most qin schools and societies are based in China, but during the twentieth century many overseas societies began to form. Although qin study was initially confined to China in ancient times, countries like Japan also have their own qin traditions via import from China, but are extremely small in scale. The Tokyo Qin Society was recently founded, opening up more opportunities for qin study in Japan. Japan has published a qinpu (qin tablature collection) in the past, known as Toukou Kinpu or Donggao Qinpu 【東臯琴譜】. Other qin societies exist in North America and Europe, which are less formal than their counterparts in mainland China, such as the North American Guqin Association and the London Youlan Qin Society.

China, etc

Asia

North America

Europe

Oceania

Others

See also
Guqin
Contemporary guqin players
Traditional Chinese musical instruments
International Directory of Guqin Teachers

References

Please see: References section in the guqin article for a full list of references used in all qin related articles.

S